The Col. William H. Robinson House on 4th Ave., NE, in Mayville, North Dakota was built in 1900.  It includes Late Victorian architecture and has also been known as the Inga B. Grinager House.  It was listed on the National Register of Historic Places in 1977.

It has an octagonal tower.  It became a contributing property to the Mayville Historic District in 1985.

See also
Grinager Mercantile Building, also NRHP-listed in Mayville

References

External links

Houses on the National Register of Historic Places in North Dakota
Victorian architecture in North Dakota
Houses completed in 1900
Houses in Traill County, North Dakota
Historic American Buildings Survey in North Dakota
National Register of Historic Places in Traill County, North Dakota
1900 establishments in North Dakota
Individually listed contributing properties to historic districts on the National Register in North Dakota
Mayville, North Dakota